Yaadein (English: Memories) is a 1964 black and white Hindi film directed and produced by Sunil Dutt who also stars in the film as the only actor to appear onscreen in the entire film. The only other actor in the film is Dutt’s wife Nargis Dutt who only appears as a silhouette in the final scene.

This film is the first Indian film in cinema that features only a single actor and hence has found an entry in the Guinness Book of World Records in the category Fewest actors in a narrative film.

Film narrative progresses through dialogues and background music composed by Vasant Desai, who also gave two songs sung by Lata Mangeshkar.

Overview

The film is soliloquy of a man who comes home to find that his wife and son are not at home, he assumes that they have left him and reminiscences his life with them, and scared of his life without them, he regrets his past indiscretions.

Music
 "Radha Tu Hai Diwani" - Lata Mangeshkar
 "Dekha Hai Sapna Koi" - Lata Mangeshkar

Cast
 Sunil Dutt - Anil

Awards

 1964: National Awards
 National Film Award for Best Feature Film in Hindi
 1966: Filmfare Award
 Best Cinematographer: S. Ramachandra (B&W category)
 Best Sound: Essa M. Suratwala

References

External links
 

1964 films
1960s Hindi-language films
1960s mystery drama films
Indian mystery drama films
Indian black-and-white films
Films directed by Sunil Dutt
One-character films
Films scored by Vasant Desai
1964 directorial debut films
1964 drama films